The name Corvin comes from the Latin name Corvinus which derives from the Latin word corvus meaning raven, although the word today refers to the birds' genus including ravens and crows among others.

Corvin most commonly is a surname, but it and its variations are being used as a given name as well.

As a given name its most common variations are Corvan, Korvin and Korwin and their English equivalent Raven.

The surname Corvin in Ireland, also transcribed as Corvan, Corravan and others, is a corruption of the Irish (Gaelic) name O Corra Ban, part of the O Corra (in English Corr) sept or sub-clan. "Corr" means odd, singular, while the addition of "Ban" means white. The Corr sept    fell under the authority of the O Neill clan. The O Corra Bans were concentrated in County Armagh where versions of the name are still most commonly found.  Following political and religious unrest in Armagh in the 1790s, there was a migration of numbers of Catholic families from the county, including a number of Corvins or Corvans.

Surname

Historical
As a surname it can refer to:
Marcus Valerius Corvus ( – ), an important military commander and politician. Considered a hero in the Roman Republic, of the Patrician gens Valeria, and unconfirmed founder of gens Corvin/Corvinus;
Marcus Valerius Messalla Corvinus (64 BC – 8 AD), a Roman general, author, patron of literature and art. Descendant of Marcus Valerius Corvus and the legendary ancestor of Hungarian Royalty;
Hunyadi family, a Hungarian noble family that is also referred to as the Corvin or Corvinus family. Mentions of the Corvin or Corvinus coat of arms in historical documents refer to the one of House Hunyadi;
Matthias Corvinus of Hungary, one of the most famous Hungarian rulers, also known as Mátyás Hunyadi or Matei Corvin, known as King Matthias the Just, and represents in tales and folklore the ideal ruler;
Ion Corvin (Romanian variant of John Hunyadi), (–1456), Voivode of Transylvania, captain-general and regent of the Kingdom of Hungary
János Corvinus (John Corvinus; 1473–1504), a Hungarian politician, illegitimate son of Matthias Corvinus;
Diego Suárez Corvín, also known as Diego Suárez Montañés or el Montañés (1552–1623), Spanish soldier and writer

19th century onward
Hugh Corvin (1900–1975), Irish republican leader
Otto von Corvin (1812–1886), German author
Nicole Dyane Corvinus (1994–), German singer

Given name

Places
Corvin Castle, also known as Hunyadi Castle or Hunedoara Castle, a Gothic-Renaissance castle in Hunedoara, Romania
Corvin River or Valea Mare a right tributary of the Danube in Romania
Ion Corvin, Constanța, a commune in Constanţa County, Romania
Corvinus University of Budapest, a Hungarian university
Hundreds of streets, schools, museums, hotels, etc. are named after King Matthias Corvinus in the current territory of Hungary and also in the former territory of the Kingdom of Hungary, which bear the name Corvin or Corvinus.
Corvin-negyed metro station, a station on the M3 line of the Budapest Metro, Hungary
Korwin-Litwicki Urban Manor, built by the project of Architect Carlo Rossi in  Tver, Russia

Arts and entertainment
Michael Corvin, a fictional character from the Underworld film series, portrayed by Scott Speedman. The character is hinted at being related to King Matthias the Just of Hungary, which would make him a fictional claimant to the crown of the Kingdom of Hungary
Corvinus Quartet, renowned Budapest-based Hungarian string quartet.

See also
 Korwin coat of arms

References